The Music of Christmas is the first Christmas album and seventh studio album overall by American contemporary Christian music singer and songwriter Steven Curtis Chapman. It was released on September 26, 1995.

Track listing
All songs written and/or arranged by Steven Curtis Chapman, except where noted.
 "Hark! The Herald Angels Sing/The Music Of Christmas"(Charles Wesley, Felix Mendelson, Chapman) – 6:43
 "Christmas Is All In The Heart" (feat. CeCe Winans) – 5:15
 "Angels We Have Heard on High" (Edward Shippen Barnes) – 5:39
 "O Come, O Come, Emmanuel" (John Mason Neale, Henry Sloane Coffin) – 3:28
 "Our God Is With Us" (Chapman, Michael W. Smith) – 6:43
 Interlude: "The Music Of Christmas" (Handel, Wesley, Mendelson, Barnes, Chapman, Buchanan) – 4:46
 "This Baby" (William C. Dix, Chapman) – 4:35
 "Silent Night/Away in a Manger/O Holy Night" (Franz Gruber, James R. Murray, Adolphe Adam, Chapman) – 6:03
 "Carol of the Bells" (Mykola Leontovych, arranged by Chapman) – 3:44
 "O Come All Ye Faithful" (John Francis Wade, Chapman) – 4:18
 "Going Home For Christmas" (Chapman, James Isaac Elliot) – 5:25
 "Precious Promise" – 4:12

Personnel 
 Steven Curtis Chapman – lead vocals, acoustic guitar (1, 2, 6, 7–12), hi-strung guitar (1, 9, 10), backing vocals (3, 7, 11), gut-string guitar (6, 8, 9), E-coustic guitar (9), dobro (9), hammered dulcimer (9),  mandolin (9, 11), 12-string guitar (10, 11), Roland VG synth guitar (12)
 Robbie Buchanan – keyboards (1, 3, 5, 11), programming (6)
 Shane Keister – acoustic piano (1, 4, 11), keyboards (2, 7, 10)
 Scott Sheriff – keyboards (8)
 Blair Masters – programming (9)
 Gordon Kennedy – electric guitar (1, 3, 7, 11), backing vocals (1, 5, 10), acoustic guitar (5)
 Jerry McPherson – electric guitar (1, 2, 7, 10)
 Randy Pearce – electric guitar (3)
 Dann Huff – electric guitar (5)
 Paul Franklin – steel guitar (11)
 Leland Sklar – bass (1, 3, 5, 7, 11)
 Jimmie Lee Sloas – bass (2, 10)
 Steve Brewster – drums (1, 3, 5, 7, 11), programming (3, 7)
 Paul Leim – drums (2, 10)
 Terry McMillan – jingle bells (7)
 Ronn Huff – string arrangements (1, 3–6, 8–10, 12, choral arrangement (4, 8)
 Gavyn Wright – concertmaster (1, 3–6, 8–10, 12)
 London Session Orchestra – strings (1, 3–6, 8–10, 12)
 Don Hart – string arrangements (2, 10)
 The Nashville String Machine – strings (2), additional strings (10)
 Max Carl – backing vocals (1, 5, 7, 10)
 Bob Carlisle – backing vocals (1, 5, 10)
 Lisa Cochran – backing vocals (1, 5, 10)
 Robin Johnson – backing vocals (1, 5, 10)
 Michael Mellett – backing vocals (1, 5, 10)
 The Belmont Church Choir – choir (1)
 The Kids Connection Choir – kids choir (1)
 CeCe Winans – harmony vocals (2)
 Bill Champlin – backing vocals (3)
 Tommy Funderburk – backing vocals (3, 7, 11)
 The American Boychoir – boychoir (4, 8), intro choir (7)
 Alan Arak – additional intro vocals (7)
 Robert Carpenter – additional intro vocals (7)
 Charles Eversole – additional intro vocals (7)
 Barry Phillips – additional intro vocals (7)
 Herb Chapman Jr. – backing vocals (8)
 Herb Chapman Sr. – backing vocals (8)
 Terry Wood – backing vocals (11)

Production 
 Steven Curtis Chapman – producer
 Brown Bannister – producer, additional engineering
 Peter York – executive producer
 Dan Raines – executive producer
 Traci Sterling Bishir – production coordinator
 Steve Bishir – track and overdub engineering
 Jeff Balding – tracking ("Christmas is All in the Heart" and "O Come All Ye Faithful")
 The Dugout (Nashville, Tennessee) – tracking location, overdub recording location
 Mole End Studio (Franklin, Tennessee) – overdub recording location
 Quad Studios (Nashville, Tennessee) – overdub recording location
 OmniSound (Nashville, Tennessee) – overdub recording location
 Devonshire Studio (North Hollywood, California) – overdub recording location
 Ocean Studio (Burbank, California) – overdub recording location
 Sound on Sound Recording (New York City, New York) – overdub recording location
 Steve Bishir – recording engineer for the London Session Orchestra and Nashville String Machine
 The Bennett House (Franklin, Tennessee) – recording location for the London Session Orchestra and Nashville String Machine
 Guy Defazio – additional engineering
 Martin Woodlee – additional engineering, assistant engineer
 Patrick Kelly – additional engineering
 Joey Grimstead – assistant engineer
 Aaron Swihart – assistant engineer
 Bill Schnee – mixing
 Schnee Studio (North Hollywood, California) – mixing location
 John Hendrickson – mix assistant
 Doug Sax – mastering 
 The Mastering Lab (Hollywood, California) – mastering location
 Karen Phillpott – art direction
 Franke Design – cover
 East-West Design (Nashville, Tennessee) – design 
 David Maisel – photography
 Johnny Villanueva – hair and make-up
 Jamie Kearney – stylist

Charts
Album - Billboard (North America)

Certifications

References 

1995 Christmas albums
Christmas albums by American artists
Steven Curtis Chapman albums
Albums produced by Brown Bannister